The 1995–96 Tampa Bay Lightning season was the Lightning fourth season of operation in the National Hockey League. The Lightning finished with a record of 38-32-12 and qualified for the playoffs for the first time in franchise history.

It would also be the Lightning's third and final season in the ThunderDome before moving into their next and current home, the Ice Palace.

Regular season
The Lightning tied the New York Rangers and the Ottawa Senators for fewest short-handed goals scored (6).

Final standings

Game log

Playoffs

Eastern Conference Quarterfinals

(1) Philadelphia Flyers vs. (8) Tampa Bay Lightning
The series opened up in Philadelphia. The Flyers won Game 1 7-3, but the Lightning rebounded in Game 2 by a 2-1 overtime win. Games 3 and 4 were in Tampa Bay. The Lightning won again in overtime in Game 3, but this time, by a score of 5-4. However, the series was tied up at 2-2 thanks to Philadelphia's 4-1 win in Game 4. The series shifted back to Philadelphia, where the Flyers won 4-1 again in Game 5. In Game 6, Philadelphia won 6-1 and won the series 4-2.

Player stats

Regular season
Scoring

Goaltending

Playoffs
Scoring

Goaltending

Note: Pos = Position; GP = Games played; G = Goals; A = Assists; Pts = Points; +/- = plus/minus; PIM = Penalty minutes; PPG = Power-play goals; SHG = Short-handed goals; GWG = Game-winning goals
MIN = Minutes played; W = Wins; L = Losses; T = Ties; GA = Goals-against; GAA = Goals-against average; SO = Shutouts; SA = Shots against; SV = Shots saved; SV% = Save percentage;

Draft picks
Tampa Bay's draft picks at the 1995 NHL Entry Draft held at the Edmonton Coliseum in Edmonton, Alberta.

See also
1995–96 NHL season

References
 

T
T
Tampa Bay Lightning seasons
Tamp
Tamp